Vladimir Fyodorovich Dyatchin (born 14 October 1982, in Lipetsk) is a Russian long-distance swimmer. He won the 10 km open water at the 2007 World Aquatics Championships despite suffering 10-inch long lacerations on both of sides of his rib cage, caused by a jellyfish sting.

In 2007 he was voted as Swimming World's Open Water Swimmer of the Year.

See also
 World Open Water Championships - Multiple medalists

References

External links
 

1982 births
Male long-distance swimmers
Sportspeople from Lipetsk
Russian male swimmers
Swimmers at the 2008 Summer Olympics
Swimmers at the 2012 Summer Olympics
Olympic swimmers of Russia
Living people
World Aquatics Championships medalists in open water swimming
20th-century Russian people
21st-century Russian people